Clotilde Théry is a professor and INSERM director of research (DR2) at Institut Curie in Paris, France. She is president of the International Society for Extracellular Vesicles (ISEV), where she previously served as founding secretary general and as editor-in-chief of the Journal of Extracellular Vesicles. She is team leader of the group "Extracellular Vesicles, Immune Responses and Cancer" within the INSERM Unit 932 on "Immunity and Cancer." Théry researches extracellular vesicles that are released by immune and tumor cells, including exosomes that originate in the multivesicular body.

Career
After a PhD in France, Théry completed a first post-doctoral fellowship in the United Kingdom and the United States in the field of developmental biology of the nervous system. Returning to France, Théry next took up the topic of cell biology of immune responses at Institut Curie.

Théry began studying exosomes in 1998, at a time when EVs were considered to be uninteresting or even artifacts. In 2007, Théry's current team on Extracellular Vesicles, Immune responses and Cancer was started at Institut Curie, now a member of the PSL Research University.

Research
Théry's lab is interested in how EVs, including exosomes, mediate communication between cells of the immune system and cancer cells. She is the most cited author of several cell biology journals: Annual Review of Cell and Developmental Biology, Current protocols in cell biology, Journal of Extracellular Vesicles.

Leadership and awards
 2011 Théry co-organized the first “International Workshop on Exosomes” at Institut Curie, in Paris, France. This meeting led to the creation of the International Society for Extracellular Vesicles (ISEV).
 2012–2016 Secretary general, ISEV
 2012–2019 Editor-in-chief of the Journal of Extracellular Vesicles (with Yong Song Gho and Peter Quesenberry)
 2014 ISEV Special Achievement Award  
 2018 Théry and Kenneth Witwer co-coordinated the Minimal Information for Studies of EVs (MISEV2018), a position and consensus statement of ISEV
 2019 Curie-NCI Award (with Jennifer Jones of National Cancer Institute)
 2020- President, ISEV

References

Living people
Year of birth missing (living people)
Place of birth missing (living people)
French molecular biologists
Cell biologists
French women biologists
Women molecular biologists
Scientists from Paris
Academic journal editors
Collège de France alumni
Columbia University fellows
20th-century French scientists
21st-century French scientists
20th-century French women scientists
21st-century French women scientists
20th-century biologists
21st-century biologists